Tarkio may refer to:

Tarkio River, a river that runs through Iowa and Missouri
Tarkio Township, Atchison County, Missouri
Tarkio, Missouri, a town on the Tarkio River in the northwest corner of Missouri in Tarkio Township
Tarkio (album), a 1970 album by the folk-rock duo Brewer & Shipley, named for the city in Missouri
Tarkio College, a college no longer in existence in the city of Tarkio, Missouri
Tarkio, Montana, a small town near Missoula, Montana
Tarkio (band), an indie rock group which took its name from the town in Montana
Tarkio Township, Page County, Iowa